Andrea Lloyd may refer to:

 Andrea Lloyd-Curry (born 1965), American former basketball player
 Andria Lloyd (born 1971), Jamaican sprinter